Takifugu is a genus of pufferfish, often better known by the Japanese name . There are 25 species belonging to the genus Takifugu and most of these are native to salt and brackish waters of the northwest Pacific, but a few species are found in freshwater of Asia or more widely in the Indo-Pacific region. Their diet consists mostly of algae, molluscs, invertebrates and sometimes crustaceans. The fish defend themselves by inflating their bodies to several times normal size and by poisoning their predators.  These defenses allow the fish to actively explore their environment without much fear of being attacked.

The fish is highly toxic, but despite this—or perhaps because of it—it is considered a delicacy in Japan. The fish contains lethal amounts of the poison tetrodotoxin in the internal organs, especially the liver and the ovaries, but also in the skin and the testes. Therefore, only specially licensed chefs can prepare and sell fugu to the public, and the consumption of the liver and ovaries is forbidden. But because small amounts of the poison give a special desired sensation on the tongue, these parts are considered the most delicious by some gourmets. Every year a number of people die because they underestimate the amount of poison in the consumed fish parts.

The poison paralyzes the muscles while the victim stays fully conscious, and eventually dies from asphyxiation. There is currently no antidote, and the standard medical approach is to try to support the respiratory and circulatory system until the effect of the poison wears off.

The fish is also featured prominently in Japanese art and culture.

Distribution and conservation status
There are 25 species belonging to the genus Takifugu. Most species are restricted to salt and brackish waters of the northwest Pacific, but a few occur more widely in the Indo-Pacific region or in freshwater of Asia. Although several are euryhaline (can adapt to various salinities) to some extent, most are unable to live in freshwater. Two exceptions are the anadromous Takifugu obscurus and the Takifugu ocellatus, which lives in coastal marine waters but migrates into fresh water to spawn in rivers.

Most species in the genus are not considered threatened, but there are two notable exceptions: the critically endangered Takifugu chinensis and the endangered Takifugu plagiocellatus.

Takifugu rubripes serves as a model organism in biological research.

Morphology and behaviour
The pear-shaped Takifugu, like all pufferfish, are not fast swimmers as they mainly use their pectoral fins for propulsion, but they are very manoeuvrable and able to hover, swim backwards, and change direction much more quickly than most other types of fish. As a result, they are rarely found in open water and prefer to stay relatively close to the sea bed where they can explore complex environments such as oyster beds, seagrass meadows, and rocky reefs. Nevertheless, these fish are very curious and active, and in some cases even aggressive against other fugu or other fish.

In the event of danger, the fish inflates itself by filling its extremely elastic stomach with water (or air when outside of the water) until the fish is almost spherical (hence the name blowfish or pufferfish). A series of things happen when a pufferfish inflates: First, the pufferfish fills its mouth with water. Then, it seals its mouth using a special valve at the bottom of the mouth. This valve flaps upward and covers the entire mouth of the fish. Next, a branchiostegal ray (a modified gill arch) pushes the water down the esophagus into the stomach. The extremely elastic stomach then expands. Depending on the species the fugu can achieve an almost perfect spherical shape.

Their diet consists mostly of algae, mollusks, invertebrates and sometimes crustaceans. All fishes in the pufferfish family have strong teeth that may grow too long if the fish cannot consume abrasive food. Fugu can bite if provoked and its bite is very nasty and painful. Not all Takifugu have been studied in detail, but the most researched species is Takifugu rubripes, due to the commercial farming of this fish for human consumption. As far as known, most species live exclusively in marine and brackish water, also breeding in this habitat. The anadromous Takifugu obscurus migrates from its coastal marine habitat into fresh water to spawn. An even more exceptional and unique breeding behavior is displayed by Takifugu niphobles. They gather in groups at certain beaches, throw themselves onto land where fertilization happens and then return to the water. The eggs either float back into the water or may stay on land under rocks for a period, only hatching when again submerged by high tide. This breeding behavior is unique among pufferfish, but found in a few other unrelated fish like capelin and grunion.

Fugu can also change color over time, and they get a darker or lighter color. This helps them to camouflage.  A very dark color may be a sign of stress or illness.

Toxicity
The fish's main defense, is the neurotoxin contained in its internal organs, mainly the ovaries and the liver, to a lesser extent in the intestines and the skin, and only minute amounts in the muscles and blood.  This makes the fugu a lethal meal for most predators, including the occasional human.

The toxin is called tetrodotoxin, or more precisely anhydrotetrodotoxin 4-epitetrodotoxin and is about 1200 times deadlier than cyanide. This poison can also be found in other animals such as the Blue-Ringed Octopus, cone snails, and even some newts. The pufferfish does not create the poison itself; rather it is generated by bacteria e.g. Pseudomonas within the fish. The fish obtains the bacteria by eating food containing these bacteria. Pufferfish that are born and grown in captivity do not produce tetrodotoxin until they receive some of the poison-producing bacteria, often by eating tissues from a toxin-producing fish. Also, some fish are more poisonous than others. Each fish has enough poison to kill around thirty adult humans.

Genome
Apparently due to some unknown selection pressure, intronic and extragenic sequences have been drastically reduced within this family.  As a result, they have the smallest-known genomes yet found amongst the vertebrate animals, while containing a genetic repertoire very similar to other fishes and thus comparable to vertebrates generally. Since these genomes are relatively compact it is relatively fast and inexpensive to compile their complete sequences, as has been done for two species of pufferfishes (Takifugu rubripes and Tetraodon nigroviridis). The former species was the second vertebrate in history to have its genome mapped, after humans.

Species
The genus Takifugu can be referred to by its lesser synonym Fugu. , there are 25 recognized species in this genus:

* Fish that have edible body parts according to the Japanese Ministry of Health and Welfare

See also
 Fugu Plan
 Seafood
 Tokiharu Abe

References

External links
 
 Extensive List of all Genus and Species for the family Tetraodontidae
 Ensembl Fugu Genome Server

 
Tetraodontidae
Japanese seafood
Fish of Japan
Marine fish genera
Freshwater fish genera
Taxa named by Tokiharu Abe

zh:四齒魨科#多紀魨屬(Takifugu)